Staveley Miners Welfare Football Club is an English football club based in Staveley, Derbyshire. They play in the Northern Counties East Football League Premier Division, at level 9 of the English football league system.

History
The club was established as a Sunday league team in 1962, and initially played at Barrow Hill under the name Nags Head. They played friendly matches for three years, before joining the Mansfield League. In 1968 they joined the Chesterfield League. In 1989 the club started playing Saturday football in the Chesterfield and District Amateur League. In 1991 they moved up to the Sheffield and Hallamshire County Senior League, winning Division Three in their first season, and Division Two in their second.

In 1993 they joined the Supreme Division of the Central Midlands League. After finishing third in 1996–97 they were accepted into Division One of the Northern Counties East League.

The club finished second in their first season in Division One, and were promoted to the Premier Division. After three seasons of struggling, they were relegated back to Division One in 2000–01, having finished bottom of the table. They finished bottom of Division One in 2002–03, but avoided relegation. In 2010–11 the club won Division One to return to the Premier Division.

Season-by-season record

Honours
Northern Counties East League
Division One champions 2010–11
League Trophy winners 1997–98, 2008–09, 2009–10
Sheffield and Hallamshire County Senior League
Division Three champions 1991–92
Division Two champions 1992–93
Chesterfield and District Amateur League
Byron Cup winners 1989–90

Records
FA Cup
Second Qualifying Round 2005–06, 2011–12, 2018–19 
FA Vase
Semi-finals 2011–12

References

External links
Club website

 
Northern Counties East Football League
Football clubs in Derbyshire
Association football clubs established in 1962
1962 establishments in England
Sheffield & Hallamshire County Senior Football League
Central Midlands Football League
Football clubs in England
Mining association football teams in England
Sheffield & Hallamshire County FA members